Bahrain is a small Arab monarchy with the first post-oil economy in the Persian Gulf region. Since the late 20th century, Bahrain has invested in the banking and tourism sectors. Many large financial institutions have a presence in Manama, the country's capital. Bahrain has a high Human Development Index and was recognised by the World Bank as a high income economy.

Notable firms 
This list includes notable companies with primary headquarters located in the country. The industry and sector follow the Industry Classification Benchmark taxonomy. Organizations which have ceased operations are included and noted as defunct.

See also
 List of banks in Bahrain
 List of supermarket chains in Bahrain
List of shopping malls in Bahrain

References 

Bahrain